Wang Shen ( 1036 –  1093), courtesy name Jinqing, was a Chinese calligrapher, painter, poet, and politician of the Song dynasty. He is best known for his surviving paintings, poetry, and calligraphy , and for his relationships with prominent statesmen and early amateur literati artists such as Su Shi, Huang Tingjian and Mi Fu.

Life
Born in the city of Taiyuan, Shanxi Province, Wang rose to a senior military position before marrying Princess Shuguo (1051-1080), the daughter of Emperor Yingzong of Song. Her older brother, Emperor Shenzong of Song, succeeded Yingzong to the throne.

In 1079, Wang was implicated in a political scandal by virtue of his friendship with Su Shi and demoted as a result of the Crow Terrace Poetry Trial, before later being exiled from the Song capital for three years.

Painting

Wang was an accomplished amateur painter, whose widely accepted surviving works are handscrolls depicting landscape scenes. One of these, painted in ink with light color in the stylistic tradition of Li Cheng and Guo Xi, is entitled "Light Snow on a Fishing Village". A handscroll in the Shanghai Museum called "Misty River , Layered Peaks" is painted in a blue-and-green palette associated with Tang painter Li Sixun. Another landscape handscroll in the Shanghai Museum shares the same title but depicts a different scene. It is noteworthy for a series of poems Wang and Su wrote each other on the scroll. Richard Barnhart has proposed that a hanging scroll attributed to Guo Xi in the Shanghai Museum is instead a fourth surviving painting by Wang.

Poetry
Although less remembered as a poet than a painter, Wang Shen traded rhymes with Su Shi, one of the most renowned poets of the Song dynastic era, if not all time.

See also
Classical Chinese poetry
Crow Terrace Poetry Trial
Emperor Shenzong of Song
Huang Tingjian
Li Cheng (painter)
Mi Fu
Su Shi
Xiaoxiang poetry

References

1030s births
1093 deaths
11th-century Chinese calligraphers
11th-century Chinese painters
11th-century Chinese poets
Painters from Henan
Poets from Henan
Political office-holders in Anhui
Politicians from Kaifeng
Song dynasty calligraphers
Song dynasty painters
Song dynasty poets
Song dynasty politicians from Henan
Writers from Kaifeng